Dąbrówka Nowa  is a village in the administrative district of Gmina Sicienko, within Bydgoszcz County, Kuyavian-Pomeranian Voivodeship, in north-central Poland.

History
During the German occupation (World War II), in 1941, the occupiers carried out expulsions of Poles, who were mostly deported to the Potulice concentration camp, while their houses and farms were handed over to German colonists as part of the Lebensraum policy. In 1945, the village was the site of the Soviet-perpetrated Dąbrówka Nowa Massacre.

References

Villages in Bydgoszcz County
Pomeranian Voivodeship (1919–1939)